The Série 1200 is a class of diesel-electric multipurpose locomotives used by Portuguese Railways (CP). A total of 25 locomotives were built between 1961 and 1964.

Technical equipment

History
A total of 25 locomotives were built by Brissonneau & Lotz and Sorefame based on a standard design previously supplied to French national railway SNCF. Upon delivery, they carried a blue livery, and were later repainted into the standard Portuguese Railways orange livery.

Operations
The Class 1200 was used on passenger and commuter trains in the Algarve region, around Porto and north of Beja. With the introduction of more powerful diesel locomotives and diesel multiple units, the Class 1200 locomotives were used for shunting duties, as well as freight services.

Withdrawn Class 1200 locomotives were sold to Argentina in 2007 as part of a rolling stock sale worth 27 million euros.

References

Railway locomotives introduced in 1961
Diesel-electric locomotives of Portugal